Malik Muhammad Saad Khan Shaheed (19 May 1959 – 27 January 2007), was one-star rank senior police officer, engineer, and former Chief Capital City Police Officer (CCPO) of Peshawar, North-West Frontier Province, Pakistan. He was in charge of security in the provincial capital of Peshawar. He was killed in a suicide bomb attack while on duty reviewing security arrangements during a Shia procession during the Islamic month of Muharram in January 2007.

Death and legacy
Still young Malik Saad was martyred in a suicide attack on 27 January 2007. His funeral was attended by over 200,000 people and his legacy remains an integral part of the history of Khyber-Pakhtunkhwa province and the Civil Services of Pakistan.

Honors
Numerous buildings and charities have been named after him, including the Malik Muhammad Saad Khan Shaheed flyover, a project which Malik Saad personally began during his tenure as DG CD&MDD and the Peshawar Police Lines, which was renamed the Malik Saad Shaheed Police Lines in his honour. Malik Saad was awarded the Nishan-e-Shujaat, the highest civilian award for gallantry.

See also
Tahir Dawar
Safwat Ghayur

References and external links 
 Malik Saad Shaheed Sports Trust Web Site
 Malik Saad memorial web site
 Durrani pays tribute to Mailk Saad  Federal minister pays tribute to Saad
 THE NEWS: NWFP loses its finest cop
 Saadi: A man always in a hurry
 December 2006 Peshawar
 January 2007 Peshawar
 NY Times Peshawar 2007
 Frontier Insurgency Spills Into Peshawar
 
The Memory Lives On
NWFP loses a fine cop
Saad the Martyr
Two Fine Police Officers

Pashtun people
Pakistani Muslims
Pakistani police officers
1959 births
2007 deaths
Pakistani civil engineers
Pakistan Army civilians
People from Kohat District
People from Peshawar